The 1947-48 French Rugby Union Championship of first division was contested by 40 clubs divided in 8 pools of five.

Thirty-two teams qualified from a federal selection and 8 from "Championnat d'Excellence".

The two better of each pool, for a total of 16 clubs was admitted to the play-off finals

The Championship was won by Lourdes who beat Toulon in the final.

Context 

 The 1948 Five Nations Championship was won by Ireland, France was second.
 The "Coupe de France" was won by Castres that beat Lourdes in the final.

Qualification round 

Teams in bold qualified for the "last 16" phase.

Last 16 

Teams in bold qualified for the quarter finals.

Quarter finals 

Teams in bold qualified for the semi finals.

Semi finals

Final

External links
 Compte rendu de la finale de 1948 lnr.fr

1948
France
Championship